William Frank Garrett (September 6, 1940 – February 25, 2010) was an American professional golfer who played on the PGA Tour in the 1960s and 1970s.

Garrett was born in Amarillo, Texas. He graduated from North Texas State University in 1962. He turned professional in 1964.

Garrett was a member of the PGA Tour from 1964–1979; he earned a living as a senior club professional after his days as a touring professional were over.

Garrett won the 1970 Coral Springs Open Invitational by one stroke over Bob Murphy. His best finish in a major was a T-47 at the 1975 British Open.

As a senior golfer, Garrett played in the PGA Senior Club Professional Championship several times finishing third in 1993, second in 1994 and T-3 in 1995. He lived in Grapevine, Texas in 1995 and Granbury, Texas at the time of his death in 2010.

Professional wins (3)

PGA Tour wins (1)

Other wins (2)
1975 Arizona Open
1985 Arizona Open

References

External links

American male golfers
North Texas Mean Green men's golfers
PGA Tour golfers
PGA Tour Champions golfers
Golfers from Texas
Sportspeople from Amarillo, Texas
People from Grapevine, Texas
People from Granbury, Texas
1940 births
2010 deaths